Zheleznodorozhny City District is a district of the city of Barnaul, Altai Krai, Russia. Population:

References

Barnaul